Lucy Akoth (born 12 December 1999) is a Kenyan footballer who plays as a defender for Mathare United FC and the Kenya women's national team.

International career
Akoth capped for Kenya at senior level during the 2019 CECAFA Women's Championship and the 2020 Turkish Women's Cup.

See also
List of Kenya women's international footballers

References

1999 births
Living people
People from Kisumu County
Kenyan women's footballers
Women's association football defenders
Kenya women's international footballers